Thomas Graf may refer to:

 Thomas Graf (biologist) (born 1944), German scientist
 Thomas Graf (luger), Italian luger